Bertonico (Lodigiano:  or ) is a comune (municipality) in the Province of Lodi in the Italian region Lombardy, located about  southeast of Milan and about  southeast of Lodi.

Bertonico borders the following municipalities: Ripalta Arpina, Moscazzano, Montodine, Turano Lodigiano, Castiglione d'Adda, Gombito, Terranova dei Passerini.

Economy is mostly based on agriculture and animal husbandry.

References

Cities and towns in Lombardy